The Catholic Persecution of 1801, also known as the Sinyu Persecution (신유박해), was a mass persecution of Korean Catholics ordered by Queen Jeongsun during King Sunjo of Joseon's reign. The government began to suppress Catholicism in the belief that it conflicted with the tenets of Confucianism.

Background
Catholicism came to Korea by way of books written by Jesuit missionaries in China. Korean scholars would read these Chinese language texts, obtained through contacts with Beijing. While most rejected the ideas expressed, a few were intrigued. One particular group, the Namin, or Southerners, viewed Catholic ideas about moral development as a field of study. Namin scholars in Gwangju were open to other schools of thought and "studied Catholicism, hoping it could supplement loopholes in the Neo-Confucianist policies that were used to rule the country".

While traffic with foreigners and their ideas was frowned upon, King Cheongjo of Joseon, who ruled from 1776 to 1800, needed the support of the Namin, and limited anti-Catholic activity to burning Catholic books and promoting Neo-Confucianism.

History
Factionalism and court politics were often closely related to the breakout of violence against Catholics. King Cheongjo died in 1800 and was succeeded by his ten-year-old son, Sunjo of Joseon. The Grand Queen Dowager, Queen Jeongsun, as the most senior member of the royal family, served as regent for her step great-grandson. In order to strengthen her position, she allied with the Noron Faction, which viewed the spreading Catholicism as a threat. Oppression of Roman Catholicism then began in earnest.
Beginning on 8 April 1801, the move was a cover for the political persecution of factions within the government which were opposing her, and were less hostile to Catholicism. 

Francis Yun Ji-heon was killed and dismembered. He was the brother of Paul Yun Ji-chung, who, with James Kwon Sang-yeon, was executed in 1791 for destroying mortuary tablets used in traditional Korean funeral rites and holding a Catholic service instead. The remains of all three were discovered in 2021 at the Chonami Shrine in Wanju County, while it was undergoing maintenance work.

Hwang Sa-yeon's incident
Hwang, a persecuted Catholic and nephew of renowned scholar Jung Yak-yong, was exiled for having been sympathetic to Catholicism despite later losing interest. He attempted to send correspondence to Catholic priests in Beijing detailing the persecution and pleading with the Qing dynasty to intervene on behalf of Catholics in Joseon, with Western ships if necessary.
The letter was intercepted en route, and Hwang was executed on December 10 (the 5th of 11th lunar month). 

By the conclusion of the persecution several hundred Catholics had been executed. However, new leaders emerged and rebuilt the community.

In popular culture
 The Book of Fish, 2021 film has reference to the persecution incident.

See also
 Korean Martyrs
 Christianity in Korea
 Seohak

References

Sources
 The Founding of Catholic Tradition in Korea, ed. by Chai-Shin Yu (Mississauga: Korean and Related Studies Press, 1996). 
 Jai-Keun Choi, The Origin of the Roman Catholic Church in Korea: An Examination of Popular and Governmental Responses Catholic Missions in the Late Chosôn Dynasty (Cheltenham, PA: Hermit Kingdom Press, 2006).

External links
 History of the Asian Missions - Introduction of Catholicism into Korea
  Short biography of James Zhou Wen-mo, born 1752, executed in 1801, from koreanmartyrs.or.kr.

1801 in Korea
1801 in Christianity
Anti-Catholicism
Catholicism-related controversies
Catholic Church in Korea
Persecution of Catholics
History of Christianity in Korea
Christianity in Joseon